Capodichino - Airport will be a station on line 1 of the Naples metro, located near the Naples-Capodichino airport.

The new metro station redesigns access to the airport with covered pedestrian walkways and a capillary network of roads, connected to the parking area. The project characterizes the terminal with the large translucent round roof that allows natural light to penetrate from above into the deep central shaft. The vertical path comes alive with the movement of travelers: the elevators and the spiral of the escalators orient and distribute the flows of arrivals and departures.

On December 15, 2013, the CIPE approved a 650 million euro loan for the Garibaldi-Capodichino Airport section, with the intermediate stops at the Centro Direzionale, Tribunale and Poggioreale.

The completion of the works, initially foreseen by the CIPE for 2018, will take place no earlier than 2023.

Interchanges 
The station will have:

  Bus stop

References 

Naples Metro stations
Railway stations in Italy opened in the 21st century